F.I.R is a 1999 Indian Malayalam-language action film directed by Shaji Kailas, written by Dennis Joseph and produced by M. Mani. It stars Suresh Gopi, Rajeev, Biju Menon, Indraja, N. F. Varghese and Maniyan Pillai Raju. The film was dubbed and released in Telugu with same name.

Plot
Roy Alex, an investigative journalist writes on hawala money from the Middle East, where he meets former M.P. and business tycoon Rahim Haji as invited by Haji's driver Basheer. Haji had lost his M.P. post a year ago after a write-up by Roy Alex in a magazine. Being an expert and a previous ace trader of the flow of foreign currency reserves to Kerala, Haji states to Roy that, most of the foreign reserves are mainly concentrated along the Gulf-American belt starting from Kottayam and extending till the coastal town of Varkala. He invited Roy as a part of reviving his failed business, and to eliminate his business rival Narendra Shetty, whom he considers as responsible for destroying his business. 

Roy follows a van carrying a drama troupe, which reaches a home far away as a part of a drama, where he sees the owner of the home, a businessman and Chakrapani, the drama director, having demands of black money, and he captures it. However, Chakrapani finds them and kills him with his dogs. While passing through a nearby road at the same time, Rahim Haji tries to contact Roy, but soon learns about his death, and soon leaves to see Shetty, who fatally shoots down him for trespassing through his territory. It is later seen that Basheer has betrayed Haji as he is in cahoots with Shetty. Haji's assassination comes as a serious blow to his party. 

The C.M. Nair appoints Mohammed Sarkar, an IPS officer in Tripura cadre, as the SP to investigate the assassination. At the same time, the party undergoes a fast headed by MLA Kunjalavi, which results in a serious rift between the police officers and party workers. After interrogating Chakrapani and Basheer, Mohammed Sarkar manages to gather evidence against Shetty and a final confrantation occurs where Basheer and Mohammed Sarkar's colleague C.I Gurumoorthy are killed. Enraged, Mohammed Sarkar finishes Shetty and his associates, consisting of  Chakrapani and Brigadier Giridhar Barua by destroying the warehouse.

Cast
Suresh Gopi as SP Mohammed Sarkar IPS
Biju Menon as CI Gregory
 Rajeev as Narendra Shetty
 Maniyanpilla Raju as CI Gurumoorthy
Indraja as Laila Mohammed
 N. F. Varghese as Retd. IG Panicker IPS
 Bheeman Raghu as Chakrapani
 Narendra Prasad as Rahim Haji
 Janardhanan as V. K. Nair, Chief Minister of Kerala
 Sai Kumar as Lance Naik Shivaram
 K. B. Ganesh Kumar as Roy Alex
Devan as Brigadier Giridhar Barua/Gireesh Mangattuserry
Mohan Jose as Basheer
Kozhikode Narayanan Nair as Thahir Sahib
 K. P. A. C. Azeez as DySP John Varghese
 Augustine as Kunjalavi MLA
 Karamana Janardanan Nair as Fr. Poulouse
 Paravoor Ramachandran as Home Minister of Kerala 
 Kumarakam Reghunath as Ramachandra Adiga
 Kunchan as Mollakka
 T. P. Madhavan as Editor Marar
 Ravi Vallathol as Judge
 Kanakalatha as Madhavi/Maria
 Priyanka as Alice
 Chali Pala

Soundtrack
The background score was composed by C. Rajamani

Reception
Sify wrote sarcastically that "There are no songs only background music. No duets and running around trees. A boring film in short".

References

External links

1990s Malayalam-language films
Films directed by Shaji Kailas
Indian action thriller films
Fictional portrayals of the Kerala Police
Films with screenplays by Dennis Joseph
1999 action thriller films
1999 films